The Senegalese Tirailleurs were a corps of colonial infantry in the French Army. They were initially recruited from Senegal,
French West Africa and subsequently throughout Western, Central and Eastern Africa: the main sub-Saharan regions of the French colonial empire. The noun tirailleur, which translates variously as 'skirmisher', 'rifleman', or 'sharpshooter', was a designation given by the French Army to indigenous infantry recruited in the various colonies and overseas possessions of the French Empire during the 19th and 20th centuries.

Despite recruitment not being limited to Senegal, these infantry units took on the adjective  since that was where the first black African Tirailleur regiment had been formed. The first Senegalese Tirailleurs were formed in 1857 and served France in a number of wars, including World War I (providing around 200,000 troops, more than 135,000 of whom fought in Europe and 30,000 of whom were killed) and World War II (recruiting 179,000 troops, 40,000 deployed to Western Europe). Tirailleur regiments were also raised in Indochina; they were called Vietnamese, Tonkinese or Annamites Tirailleurs.

History

Origins 

The Senegalese Tirailleurs were formed in 1857 by Louis Faidherbe, governor general of French West Africa, because he lacked sufficient French troops to control the territory and meet other requirements of the first phase of colonisation. The formal decree for the formation of this force was signed on 21 July 1857 in Plombières-les-Bains by Napoleon III. Recruitment was later extended to other French colonies in Africa. During its early years the corps included some former slaves bought from West African slave-owners as well as prisoners of war. Subsequent recruitment was either by voluntary enlistment or on occasion by an arbitrary form of conscription.

1870–1914 

In the aftermath of the Franco-Prussian War, the Senegalese tirailleurs continued to provide the bulk of French garrisons in West and Central Africa. Their overall numbers remained limited. However, in anticipation of the First World War, Colonel Charles Mangin described in his 1910 book La force noire his conception of a greatly expanded French colonial army, whilst Jean Jaurès, in his , suggested that the French Army should look elsewhere to recruit its armies due to the falling birthrate in mainland France.

A company-sized detachment of  took part in the conquest of Madagascar (1895), although the bulk of the non-European troops employed in this campaign were Algerian and Hausa tirailleurs. Regiments of s were subsequently recruited in Madagascar, using the Senegalese units as a model.

In 1896, a small expedition consisting mainly of 200  was assembled in Loango (French Congo) under Captain Jean-Baptiste Marchand. This "Marchand Mission" took two years to cross hundreds of miles of unexplored bush until they reached Fashoda on the Nile. Here they encountered British and Egyptian troops under Major-General Kitchener, who had just defeated the Mahadi's Dervish army near Khartoum. While the Fashoda Incident raised the possibility of war between France and Britain, tribute was paid to the courage and endurance of Marchand and his Senegalese tirailleurs by both sides.

During the early 1900s, the  saw active service in the French Congo and Chad while continuing to provide garrisons for the French possessions in West and Central Africa. In 1908, two battalions of  landed at Casablanca to begin nearly twenty years of active service in Morocco by Senegalese units. On 14 July 1913, the  paraded their standard at Longchamp, the first occasion upon which Senegalese troops had been seen in metropolitan France. New flags were presented to the 2e, 3e and 4e RTS at the same parade.

World War I 

With the outbreak of war 37 battalions of French, North African and Senegalese infantry were transferred from Morocco to France. Five Senegalese battalions were soon serving on the Western Front, while others formed part of the reduced French garrison in Morocco. The 5th BTS formed part of a French column which was wiped out near Khenifra, during the Battle of El Herri on 13 November 1914, with 646 dead. The 10th, 13th, 16th and 21st BTS subsequently saw heavy fighting in Morocco, reinforced by 9,000 additional Senegalese tirailleurs brought up from French West Africa.

On the Western Front the  served with distinction at Ypres and Dixmude during the Battle of Flanders in late 1914, at the Battle of Verdun in the recapture of Fort de Douaumont in October 1916, during the battle of Chemin des Dames in April 1917 and at the Battle of Reims in 1918. Losses were particularly heavy in Flanders (estimated from 3,200 to 4,800) and Chemin des Mains (7,000 out of 15,500 tirailleurs engaged).

Total French casualties in this campaign reached 27,000 but the Senegalese and regular Colonial Infantry were noted for the high morale that they maintained in spite of losses that reached two out of three in some units. The Senegalese tirailleurs particularly distinguished themselves in the attack during the initial French landings on the southern shore of the Dardanelles. After the withdrawal from the Dardanelles and the redeployment to the Macedonian front, further Senegalese battalions were deployed in this theatre of war.

New recruitment drive 
French military policy towards the use of African troops in Europe changed in 1915. The French high command realized that the war would last far longer than they had originally imagined. They therefore authorized a major recruitment drive in West Africa. As a result, a further 93 Senegalese battalions were raised between 1915 and 1918, of which 42 saw service in France itself. The usual practice was to bring together battalions of white Colonial Infantry and African Tirailleurs into .
(Four such regiments were formed from the seven tirailleurs and five battalions of  deployed at Gallipoli.)The harsh conditions of trench warfare were a particular source of suffering to the un-acclimatized African soldiers and, after 1914/15, the practice of hivernage was adopted: withdrawing them to the south of France for training and re-equipping each winter. In spite of their heavy losses in almost every major battle of the Western Front, the discipline and morale of the "Colonial Corps" remained high throughout the war. 

Occupation of the Rhineland 

The armistice of November 1918 had provision for the allied Occupation of the Rhineland and France played a major part in this. Between 25,000 and 40,000 colonial soldiers were part of this force. German attempts were made to discredit the use of non-European soldiers by the French during this occupation, as had earlier been the case during World War I. Although no hard evidence was produced, many campaigners claimed that the colonial soldiers – and the Senegalese in particular – were responsible for a substantial number of rapes and sexual assaults. Children resulting from these unions were stigmatised as "Rhineland Bastards" and subsequently suffered under the Nazi race laws.

Between the World Wars 

On 13 April 1925 the Rif War spilled over into French Morocco when eight thousand Berber fighters attacked a line of French outposts recently established in disputed territory north of the Ouerghala River. The majority of these posts were held by Senegalese and North African tirailleurs. By 27 April 1925 39 out of 66 posts had fallen and their garrisons massacred, or had been abandoned. Faced with what had become a major war the French increased their forces in Morocco to approximately 100,000 men. West African tirailleurs continued to play a major part in subsequent operations in both the Spanish Protectorate (until 1926) and Southern Morocco (until 1934). In one of many engagements, the 2nd Battalion of the 1st Regiment of  won 91 citations for bravery during fighting around Ain-Gatar on 22 June 1926.

Second World War 

The  was permanently deployed in the south of France due to the potential threat from Italy. It was also reasoned the climate was more suitable for African soldiers. This deployment of Tirailleurs, outside of their regions of recruitment and traditional peacetime service, arose because of the heavy casualties of the First World War. This had affected the number of metropolitan Frenchmen in the military service age group of twenty to twenty-five by more than half. Up to 200,000 tirailleurs were active during the war, which constituted about nine percent of the French forces. 

During the Battle of France, the Senegalese and other African tirailleur units served with distinction at Gien, Bourges, and Buzancais. German troops, indoctrinated with Nazi racial doctrines, expressed outrage at having fought against "inferior" opponents. At Montluzin, Senegalese prisoners were murdered by their German captors.

The Senegalese Tirailleurs saw extensive service in West Africa, Italy, and Corsica. During 1944, they assisted in the liberation of southern France. The 9th DIC (Colonial Infantry Division) included the 4th, 6th, and 13th Regiments of Senegalese Tirailleurs, and fought from Toulon to the Swiss border between August and November 1944.

After the Liberation of France, the Tirailleurs concluded their service in Europe. They were replaced by newly recruited French volunteers, on the order of Charles de Gaulle. Faced with U.S. restrictions on the size of the French forces, de Gaulle chose to incorporate the various partisan groups within the structure of the official army. The complicated process of discharge and repatriation of the Tirailleurs, coupled with the refusal of France to pay wage arrears due to released prisoners of war, led to several incidents of violence. The most notable of these was the Thiaroye massacre, in 1944, during which the French killed between 35 and 300 (sources vary) Tirailleurs. The Tirailleurs Sénégalais had been promised that in recognition of their service they would become equal citizens of France, this pledge was not kept following the end of hostilities.

After 1945 

The , comprising two battalions, served in the Indochina War between 1946 and 1954. Several independent battalions of  fought in the same theatre of war. The  comprised up to 16 percent of the French forces during the Indochina War. Also in the suppression of the uprising in Madagascar against the French colonial rule the Tirailleurs were involved.

During the Algerian War the  saw extensive active service from 1954 to 1962, mainly as part of the  – a grid of occupation detachments intended to protect farms and roads in rural areas. About 12 separate Senegalese units (either three-battalion regiments or single battalions) served in French North Africa between 1954 and 1967, when the last French troops were withdrawn. In 1958–59 the Tirailleur units were in part dissolved, as African personnel transferred to newly formed national armies when the French colonies of West and Central Africa became independent. Substantial numbers of former tirailleurs continued to serve in the French Army but as individual volunteers in integrated Colonial (later Marine) Infantry or Artillery units. The  lost their distinctive historic identity during this process. As an example, the 1er RTS, raised in 1857, became the 61st Marine Infantry Regiment in December 1958. 

The last Senegalese unit in the French Army was disbanded in 1964.

The last Senegalese Tirailleur to have served in World War I, Abdoulaye Ndiaye, died at the age of 104 in November 1998. He had been wounded in the Dardanelles.

Uniforms 

From 1857 to 1889 the  wore a dark blue zouave style uniform with yellow braiding (see first photo above). This was replaced by a loose fitting dark blue tunic and trousers worn with a red sash and chechia fez. White trousers were worn in hot weather and a light khaki drill field dress was adopted in 1898. Senegalese units sent to France in 1914 wore a new dark blue uniform, introduced in June that year, beneath the standard medium-blue greatcoats of the French infantry. This changed to sky-blue in 1915 and dark khaki started to be issued the following year. Throughout these changes the distinctive yellow cuff and collar braiding was retained, together with the fez (worn with a drab cover to reduce visibility).

Until World War II the  continued to wear the khaki uniforms described above, in either heavy cloth or light drill according to conditions. The red fez survived as a parade item until the 1950s.

Filmography 
Emitaï (1971) depicts the effects of conscription on a Diola village.

Black and White in Color (1976), by French director Jean-Jacques Annaud, 1 hour 30 minutes

Camp de Thiaroye, by Senegalese director Ousmane Sembene, 1987, 153 mins.

Le Tata, paysages de pierres, by French director Patrice Robin and Author Eveline Berruezo, 1992, 60 mins.

Rafael Gutierrez and Dario Arce : Le Tata sénégalais de Chasselay : mémoires du 25° RTS" Documentary film, 52', 2007. Productions Chromatiques- TLM, France.

Tirailleurs (2022), by Mathieu Vadepied.

Literature 
At Night All Blood Is Black is a novel by French author David Diop. First published in French on August 16, 2018, by Éditions du Seuil, it won the Prix Goncourt des Lycéens that same year.  The book centers around Alfa Ndiaye, a Senegalese Tirailleur who loses his close friend Mademba Diop while fighting in World War I.

The English translation by Anna Moschovakis won the 2021 International Booker Prize.  It was published in the UK by Pushkin Press and in the US by Farrar, Straus and Giroux.

The Franco-American journalist and historian Ted Morgan volunteered to serve during the Algerian War as a junior officer with the Senegalese, whom he described as highly disciplined soldiers with cheerful dispositions, serving in a corps that was full of surprises.

See also 
Tirailleurs: history of the original French skirmishers of this designation plus the colonial (e.g.: Algerian, Senegalese etc.) tirailleur units
French colonial troops
Spahi: French colonial cavalry regiments including Senegalese units. 
Pierre Messmer
French colonial flags
French Colonial Empire
List of French possessions and colonies

References

Bibliography 
 
 
Myron Echenberg, "Tragedy at Thiaroye: The Senegalese Soldiers' Uprising of 1944 ", in Peter Gutkind, Robin Cohen and Jean Copans (eds), African Labor History, Beverly Hills, 1978, p. 109-128
Myron Echenberg, Colonial Conscripts: The Tirailleurs Senegalais in French West Africa, 1857–1960. Heinemann (1990), 
 
 Christian Koller:»Von Wilden aller Rassen niedergemetzelt«. Die Diskussion um die Verwendung von Kolonialtruppen in Europa zwischen Rassismus, Kolonial- und Militärpolitik (1914–1930) (= Beiträge zur Kolonial- und Überseegeschichte, Bd. 82). Franz Steiner Verlag, Stuttgart 2001, .
Nancy Ellen Lawler. Soldiers of Misfortune: Ivoirien Tirailleurs of World War II. Ohio Univ Press (1992)

Filmography 
Eveline Berruezo and Patrice Robin : Le Tata – paysages de pierres. Documentary film, 60', 1992. Espace Mémoire, France.
Rafael Gutierrez and Dario Arce : Le Tata sénégalais de Chasselay : mémoires du 25° RTS" Documentary film, 52', 2007. Productions Chromatiques- TLM, France.

External links 

Senegalese Tirailleurs in WWI
Domesticated or Savage?Thoughts on the representation of the body of the senegalese tirailleurs (1880–1918) by Nicolas Bancel and Pascal Blanchard
Site on the Battle of Flandres, attention to Tirailleurs Sénégalais
 Christian Koller: Colonial Military Participation in Europe (Africa), in: 1914-1918-online. International Encyclopedia of the First World War.

French West Africa
Military history of Senegal
Military history of France
Military units and formations established in 1857
1857 establishments in the French colonial empire
Colonial troops
1850s establishments in Senegal
People of colonial Senegal
People of French West Africa